KBKY (94.1 FM) is a radio station broadcasting a Spanish religious format to the Merced, California, United States, area. The station is owned by Amador García through licensee Radio Alfa y Omega LLC.

References

External links

BKY
Mass media in Merced County, California
Merced, California
BKY